Paul King Jewett (1920–1991) was a Christian theologian, author and prominent advocate of the ordination of women and of believer's baptism. He taught systematic theology at Fuller Theological Seminary in Pasadena, California. He is credited with helping develop Fuller into one of the largest seminaries in the country.

Theology
Having studied at Wheaton College and at Westminster Theological Seminary, Jewett obtained a doctorate in theology from Harvard, and was an ordained minister in the Presbyterian Church (U.S.A.). He is credited with being one of the major instigators of the contemporary Christian egalitarian movement in the evangelical church. In 1975 his book Man as Male and Female was published. This work reconsiders the biblical evidence for the role of men and women and argues that Paul was speaking as inspired by God when he argued from the equality of women, but with a Jewish rabbinic mindset when speaking of women as subordinate to man. Jewett called Galatians 3:28 the "Magna Carta of humanity".

Jewett was an extremely controversial figure in evangelicalism beginning with his book Man as Male and Female which reconsidered traditional theology on the male/female relationship going so far as to suggest Paul was at times a chauvinistic and uninspired in some areas of the New Testament epistles. His last work, co-authored with Marguerite Shuster was meant to be part of a larger systematic theology he was writing but died before completing. It revealed liberal views on evolution, abortion, capital punishment, and homosexuality. Jewett died of cancer in Pasadena on 10 September 1991.

Books
Man as Male and Female: A Study in Sexual Relationships from a Theological Point of View. Eerdmans, 1975.
The Ordination of Women: An Essay on the Office of Christian Ministry. Eerdmans, 1980.
Infant Baptism and the Covenant of Grace: An Appraisal of the Argument That As Infants Were Once Circumcised, So They Should Now Be Baptized. Eerdmans, 1978.
The Lord's Day. Fuller Seminary Bookstore, 1978.
God, Creation, and Revelation: A Neo-Evangelical Theology. Eerdmans, 1991.
Who We Are: Our Dignity As Human : A Neo-Evangelical Theology. (Edited by Marguerite Shuster) Eerdmans, 1996.

References

External links
 Review of Paul King Jewett's writing

American Christian theologians
1920 births
1991 deaths
Fuller Theological Seminary faculty
Harvard Divinity School alumni
Deaths from cancer in California
Presbyterian Church (USA) teaching elders
20th-century American writers
20th-century American clergy